The  was a railway route operated by Towada Kankō Electric Railway (Totetsu). It ran between Misawa Station and Towadashi Station in eastern Aomori Prefecture, Japan.

History
On September 5, 1922, the  began operating a 762mm gauge line between Furumaki Station (present day Misawa Station) and Sanbongi Station (present day Towadashi Station, with intermediate stops at Shichihyaku and Takashizu. Additional stations were added in the 1930s. The line was renamed as Towada Kankō Electric Railway Line on December 30, 1951. A single direction Automatic Block Signal control system was implemented from December 16, 1971. The Towadashi terminus was rebuilt in 1985 to include a shopping complex. All freight operations on the line were suspended from 1986. A new automatic train stop (ATS) system was implemented from October 1, 2002.

The operation of the line was discontinued on April 1, 2012.

Station list

Line data
 Length: 
 Track gauge: 
 Number of stations: 11 (including termini)
 Electrification: 1500 V DC
 Tracks: single track
 Block Signal: Automatic Block Signal

Equipment
As of April 1, 2003, the company had the following equipment:
Moha 7200 stock: #7204, 7205
Moha 7700 stock and Kuha 7900 stock (formerly Tokyu 7700): #7701 + 7901–7903
Moha 3400 stock: #3401
Moha 3600 stock: #3603
ED300: #301
ED400: #402
Tora 300: #301, 302

References

External links
 official home page

Rail transport in Aomori Prefecture
Railway lines in Japan
Railway lines opened in 1922
Railway lines closed in 2012
1067 mm gauge railways in Japan